was a town located in Kaisō District, Wakayama Prefecture, Japan.

As of 2003, the town had an estimated population of 14,481 and a density of 363.57 persons per km². The total area was 39.83 km².

On April 1, 2005, Shimotsu was merged into the expanded city of Kainan.

External links
Official town website (in Japanese)

Dissolved municipalities of Wakayama Prefecture